General of the army is a military rank used to denote a senior military leader, usually a general in command of a nation's army. This rank is higher than that of just a general.

General of the army ranks by country
East Germany: Army general (East Germany)
Indonesia: General of the Army (Indonesia)
Liberia: The "five-star" general of the army (or field marshal) rank was first used by Samuel Doe (1951–1990) who promoted himself from master sergeant to the rank after seizing control of the state. The rank insignia was worn as five stars in a row on the collar and a circle of five stars on headgear. The rank was later worn as a circle of five gold stars on the collar by warlord President Charles Taylor (b. 1948). The rank has not been reintroduced since the Armed Forces of Liberia were recreated after 2004.
Russia: General of the Army (USSR); General of the Army (Russia)
United States of America: General of the Army (GA)
Uzbekistan: The rank of General of the Army (armiya generali) was until 2002 the second highest rank after the Marshal of Uzbekistan. After a law was passed on 12 December 2002, the rank of marshal was abolished and the rank of army general became the highest military rank in the Armed Forces of Uzbekistan. In wartime, the rank is assigned to the Supreme Commander-in-Chief (President of Uzbekistan) and the Minister of Defense. As of 2019, no one has been assigned the rank.
Yugoslav People's Army – four star general

Ranks equivalent to general of the army
 Field marshal (numerous countries)
  (Arabic countries)
  (Brazil)
  (Generalissimo, Republic of China)
  (Senior General, People's Republic of China)
  (Chile)
  (Croatia)
  (Cuba)
  (Marshal of France, France)
  (Indonesia)
  (Nepal)
  in Poland 
  in Turkey
  (North and South Korea)
  (Spain)
 In Spain, the rank General of the Army is a four star general.
  (Thailand)
  (Vietnam)
  (Cambodia)
  (Myanmar)

See also
Generalissimo
Général
General officer
Army general
Staff (military)
Ranks and insignia of NATO armies officers

References

Military ranks